Scotland competed at the 2022 Commonwealth Games at Birmingham, England from 28 July to 8 August 2022. Having competed at every Games since their 1930 inauguration, it was Scotland's twenty-second appearance.

Medallists

| style="text-align:left; vertical-align:top;"|

Competitors
The following is the list of number of competitors participating at the Games per sport/discipline.

Notes

Athletics

Six athletes were officially selected on 5 October 2021, though their chosen events were yet to be decided. A marathon athlete was added on 28 April 2022, followed by five para athletes on 10 June 2022 (the latter qualified via the World Para Athletics World Rankings for performances registered between 31 December 2020 and 25 April 2022).

A squad of thirty-three athletes and para athletes was confirmed on 1 July 2022, as was Stephanie Davis' withdrawal (owing to a foot injury).

Men
Track and road events

Field events

Women
Track and road events

Field events

Badminton

As of 1 June 2022, Scotland qualified for the mixed team event via the BWF World Rankings. A squad of nine players was officially selected on 8 June 2022.

Singles

Doubles

Mixed team

Summary

Squad

Alexander Dunn
Christopher Grimley
Matthew Grimley
Adam Hall
Callum Smith
Kirsty Gilmour
Julie MacPherson
Eleanor O'Donnell
Ciara Torrance

Group stage

Quarter Finals

3x3 basketball

Great Britain was the top Commonwealth European nation in the respective FIBA 3x3 Federation Rankings for men and women (on 1 November 2021), necessitating qualifiers to determine which Home Nations would receive the associated quota places. On 6 April 2022, Scotland won both (which were held in Largs) and therefore qualified for both Commonwealth Games tournaments.

Scotland won the women's IWBF European Qualifier (also held in Largs) on 14 April 2022, thereby qualifying for the women's 3x3 wheelchair basketball tournament as well.

Squad selections were announced on 4 July 2022.

Summary

Men's tournament

Roster
Gareth Murray
Fraser Malcolm
Jonathan Bunyan
Kyle Jimenez

Group A

Semifinals

Bronze medal match

Women's tournament

Roster
Hannah Robb
Sian Phillips
Claire Paxton
Kennedy Leonard

Group A

Quarterfinals

Women's wheelchair tournament

Roster
Robyn Love
Judith Hamer
Jessica Whyte
Lynsey Speirs

Group B

Semifinals

Bronze medal match

Beach volleyball

As of 26 April 2022, Scotland qualified for the women's tournament; this was achieved through their position at the European Qualifier in Edinburgh.

Two players were officially selected on 1 June 2022.

Women's tournament
Group C

Quarterfinals

Boxing

A squad of eight boxers was officially selected on 8 June 2022.

Men

Women

Cycling

A squad of seventeen cyclists and para cyclists (plus three pilots) was officially selected on 26 May 2022. Two cyclists were added to the squad on 24 June 2022.

On 13 July 2022 Team Scotland announced that Katie Archibald would not take part in the Games.

Road
Men

Women

Track
Sprint

Keirin

Time trial

Pursuit

Points race

Scratch race

Mountain Biking

Diving

One diver was officially selected on 13 December 2021. A squad of seven divers was later confirmed on 16 June 2022, with an eighth diver added on 11 July 2022.

Men

Women

Mixed

Gymnastics

A squad of seven gymnasts was officially selected on 6 June 2022. Another three gymnasts were added on 1 July 2022.

Artistic
Men
Team Final & Individual Qualification

Individual Finals

Women
Team Final & Individual Qualification

Individual Finals

Rhythmic
Individual Qualification

Individual Finals

Hockey

By virtue of their position in the FIH World Rankings for men and women respectively (as of 1 February 2022), Scotland qualified for both tournaments.

Detailed fixtures were released on 9 March 2022. The women's squad was announced on 13 June 2022, followed by the men's squad on 5 July 2022.

Summary

Men's tournament

Tommy Alexander
Michael Bremner
Andy Bull
Murray Collins
Callum Duke
Rob Field
David Forrester
Alan Forsyth (c)
Cammy Golden
Jamie Golden
Ed Greaves
Rob Harwood
Callum Mackenzie
Andy McConnell
Lee Morton
Duncan Riddell
Robbie Shepherdson
Struan Walker

Group play

Ninth place match

Women's tournament

Roster

Amy Costello
Amy Gibson
Becky Ward
Bronwyn Shields
Charlotte Watson
Ellie Wilson
Eve Pearson
Fiona Burnet
Heather McEwan
Jennifer Eadie
Jessica Ross
Katie Robertson (vc)
Louise Campbell
Millie Steiger
Nicki Cochrane
Robyn Collins
Sarah Jamieson
Sarah Robertson (c)

Group play

Fifth place match

Judo

A squad of eleven judoka was officially selected on 8 June 2022.

Men

Women

Lawn bowls

A squad of ten bowlers (five per gender) was officially selected on 15 December 2021. Eight para bowlers (four per gender) were added on 18 February 2022.

Among those chosen is George Miller, potentially the oldest Team Scotland competitor in history (he will be 75 years and 8 months of age during the Games). Garry Hood will contest his second Commonwealth Games 28 years after his first.

Men

Women

Parasport

Netball

By virtue of its position in the World Netball Rankings (as of 31 January 2022), Scotland qualified for the tournament.

Complete fixtures were announced in March 2022.

Summary

Roster
Twelve players were selected on 8 June 2022.

Claire Maxwell (c)
Emily Nicholl (vc)
Lynsey Gallagher
Niamh McCall
Emma Barrie
Iona Christian
Hannah Leighton
Sarah MacPhail
Lauren Tait
Rachel Conway
Bethan Goodwin
Kelly Boyle	

Group play

Ninth place match

Para powerlifting

As of 8 June 2022, Scotland qualified one powerlifter through the World Para Powerlifting Commonwealth Rankings (for performances between 1 January 2020 and 25 April 2022).

Rugby sevens

As of 26 October 2021, Scotland officially qualified for both the men's and women's tournaments. The men achieved qualification through their positions in the 2018–19 / 2019–20 World Rugby Sevens Series, whereas the women achieved qualification via the Moscow round of the 2021 Rugby Europe Women's Sevens Championship Series.

Both squads were confirmed on 8 July 2022.

Summary

Men's tournament

Roster
 
Jamie Farndale (c)
Alec Coombes
Ross McCann
Grant Hughes
Paddy Kelly
Kaleem Barreto
Robbie Fergusson
Matt Davidson
Harvey Elms
Lee Jones
Jordan Edmunds
Femi Sofolarin
Jacob Henry

Pool B

Quarterfinals

5th-8th Semifinals

Fifth place match

Women's tournament

Roster
 
Rachel McLachlan
Emma Orr
Megan Gaffney
Eilidh Sinclair
Evie Gallagher
Lisa Thomson (co-c)
Helen Nelson (co-c)
Caity Mattinson
Chloe Rollie
Meryl Smith
Shona Campbell
Liz Musgrove
Rhona Lloyd

Pool B

5th-8th Semifinals

Fifth place match

Squash

A squad of six players was officially selected on 8 June 2022.

Singles

Doubles

Swimming

Two swimmers were officially selected on 16 December 2021. Twenty-four swimmers (including Tokyo 2020 relay champion Duncan Scott) were confirmed on 16 June 2022, though Kathleen Dawson had to withdraw from the squad back to a back injury. Another two swimmers were added to the squad on 11 July 2022.

Those picked for the parasport events had qualified via the World Para Swimming Para Rankings for performances between 31 December 2020 and 18 April 2022.

Men

Women

Mixed

Table tennis

Four players were officially selected on 29 April 2022.

Singles

Doubles

Triathlon

One triathlete was officially selected on 14 December 2021, followed by the selection of one paratriathlete on 9 May 2022 (their guide was later confirmed on 1 July 2022).

Three more triathletes were added to complete the five-strong squad on 8 June 2022.

Individual

Paratriathlon

Mixed Relay

Weightlifting

Courtesy of their positions on the IWF Commonwealth Ranking List (which was finalised on 9 March 2022), a squad of five weightlifters (two men, three women) was officially selected on 21 April 2022.

Men

Women

Wrestling

A squad of five wrestlers was officially selected on 22 June 2022, followed by the addition of a sixth on 1 July 2022.

Repechage Format

Group Stage Format

Feats and milestones 

Team Scotland produced a record medal haul outwith a home games of 51 medals and its second largest total ever behind Glasgow 2014. Eilish McColgan (10,000 m silver) won the 500th Commonwealth Games medal for Scotland since it began in 1930.

Scottish Cycling secured a record medal haul with 11 in total. Neah Evans became the first Scottish cyclist to win three medals at the same Games.

Scottish Athletics achieved its best medal total with eight since 10 medals in 1982. Laura Muir was the first Scottish woman to win the 1500 metres at the Games. The women's 4 x 100 metres relay had also qualified for the Games for first time in 36 years. 

Scotland won three good medals in boxing for the first time. With five medals in total, it was the best total since 1986.

References

External links
Commonwealth Games Scotland Official site

Nations at the 2022 Commonwealth Games
2022
2022 in Scottish sport